Sheena Shahabadi (born 10 April 1986 in Mumbai) is an Indian actress. Her first film role was starring in the film Teree Sang (2009).

She is the daughter of Rajkumar Shahbadi and actress Sadhana Singh. She became interested in acting because of her mother's work.

Shahabadi was formerly married to Vaibhav Gore.

Filmography

References

External links
 
 

Living people
1986 births
Actresses in Telugu cinema
Actresses in Hindi cinema
Actresses in Kannada cinema
Indian film actresses
21st-century Indian actresses
Actresses from Mumbai